Giganteus Island lies just north of the Rookery Islands in the west part of Holme Bay, MacRobertson Land.  Mapped by Norwegian cartographers from air photos taken by the Lars Christensen Expedition, 1936–37.  A giant petrel (Macronectes giganteus) rookery was observed by ANARE on the island in December 1958, hence the name.

See also 
 Composite Antarctic Gazetteer
 List of Antarctic islands south of 60° S
 SCAR
 Territorial claims in Antarctica

References

External links
 Topographic Map 1:3,000
Islands of Mac. Robertson Land